Bombella apis is a Gram-negative, strictly aerobic, non-spore-forming, rod-shaped and non-motile bacterium from the genus of Bombella which has been isolated from the midgut of a bee (Apis mellifera).

References

External links
Type strain of Bombella apis at BacDive -  the Bacterial Diversity Metadatabase

Rhodospirillales
Bacteria described in 2017